They Dare to Speak Out: People and Institutions Confront Israel's Lobby is a bestselling book (nine weeks a Washington Post bestseller) that was written in 1985 (Westport, Connecticut: Lawrence Hill), had a second edition published in 1989 (Chicago: Lawrence Hill Books, 1556520735) and a third in 2003 (Chicago: Lawrence Hill Books) by former US Representative Paul Findley.

The Washington Post said in a review that the book's "message is straightforward and valid: Israeli influence in the United States, including in the inner sanctums of government, is very strong." The New York Times, in a review by Adam Clymer, noted that Findley had been defeated by "a combination of an able opponent, the recession, redistricting and a heavy infusion of money from pro-Israel political action committees" and described the book as "an angry, one-sided book that seems often to be little more than a stringing together of stray incidents".

The Christian Science Monitor's review stated that "Findley examines the history of America's lopsided official attitude toward the Middle East, a score of the most egregious examples of AIPAC's behavior, and the effect of all of this on public debate and policy. Because of his access to highly placed government officials, Findley's book contains a wealth of original statements and observations from William Fulbright, Philip Klutznick, George Ball, Zbigniew Brzezinski, and the Rev. Jesse Jackson and many other prominent figures, speaking on the record and off."

Contents
The book examines Israel and the Israel lobby and the degree of control they have over the United States Government, based on his experience representing the State of Illinois in the United States House of Representatives.

It argues that pro-Israeli groups such as the American Israel Public Affairs Committee (AIPAC) are able to suppress free debate, compromise national secrets, and shape US foreign policy.

Findley focuses on individuals who have stood up to the pro-Israel forces and brings out their statements and observations on the Middle East and US foreign policy toward Israel.

See also
 Israel lobby in the United States

References

External links
 They Dare to Speak Out online ebook.

1985 non-fiction books
American Israel Public Affairs Committee
Books about foreign relations of the United States
Books about Israel
Israel–United States relations